Abdalabad or Ebdalabad may refer to:
 Ebdalabad, Chaharmahal and Bakhtiari
 Abdalabad, Razavi Khorasan

See also
 Abdolabad (disambiguation)